Kletsk Castle was a castle in Belarus. It was completely destroyed by the Swedes in 1706.

References

Castles in Belarus
Kletsk
Buildings and structures demolished in 1706